Greg W. Greeley was the President of Homes at Airbnb where he oversaw the Homes division of Airbnb, including the Airbnb Plus program offering vetted vacation rentals with more hotel-like services.

Education 
Greeley attended both the University of Washington and the University of Southern California.

He received his MBA in 1998 from the University of California, Berkeley, Haas School of Business.

Career 
Prior to being hired by Airbnb on March 6, 2018, Greeley worked at Amazon as the Vice President of Amazon Prime. Greeley had been at Amazon for more than 18 years prior to his resignation and helped Amazon expand its Prime membership service internationally.

At Airbnb Greeley lead the Homes unit which includes Airbnb's standard offering as well as Airbnb plus, which was launched on February 22, 2018, and is geared toward high-end travelers. Greeley also oversaw Airbnb Collections, the Superhost program, and the Superguest program. He reported directly to Airbnb Founder and CEO, Brian Chesky, before being let go from the company in July 2020.

Airbnb's hiring of Greeley was a move that was criticized as he has no prior experience in the hospitality industry.

References 

Year of birth missing (living people)
Living people
Amazon (company) people
Haas School of Business alumni
University of Southern California alumni
University of Washington alumni

https://www.theinformation.com/articles/top-airbnb-executive-to-depart